Đorđe Kunovac (Serbian Cyrillic: ЂорЂе Куновац, born 8 June 1975) is a retired professional Bosnian-Herzegovinian football player and a current football manager.

Playing career
Born in Trebinje, he began playing football in his home-town club FK Leotar. He was spotted there by FK Partizan who brought him to their youth team. He started playing as senior in the First League of FR Yugoslavia clubs FK Bečej and FK Rad. He played with Leotar in the First League of the Republika Srpska during until 2000, before coming to Germany to play in Fortuna Düsseldorf. Afterwards, he was back to Rad and in 2002 played for Montenegrin club FK Mogren before finishing his playing career in FK Sinđelić Beograd.

Coaching career
He was the coach of a Belgrade-based Serbian club FK Sveti Stefan. For the 2011–12 season he was appointed as head coach of FK Milutinac Zemun. After a few months Kunovac resigned as coach of FK Milutinac Zemun and later that year he was appointed as manager of FK Palilulac Beograd. For the 2012–13 season he started as a head coach of a FK Zmaj Zemun, but again after a few months re-resigned. Second part of the 2012–13 season he worked again as a head coach in FK Milutinac Zemun, and played for the senior team. For the 2013–14 season he was appointed as a manager of Slovak side FK Spartak Bánovce nad Bebravou.

At the beginning of the 2014–15 season he took over managing Belgrade lower league club FK Torlak from Kumodraž. Torlak competes in 5th tier of Serbian football league system. In his first season as Torlak manager he won the league and got promoted to Belgrade Zone League (4th tier). He won the first tournament named Voždovac Trophy. In his second season the team won second Voždovac Trophy, and later that year fourth place on the end of the first part of the season, surprising everyone, which was expected by no one. FK Torlak style of play was recognizable in Belgrade at the time. Sadly, he resigned 3 rounds before end of the season due to differences with the club management. He was considered one of the best coaches in the league. After that he led newly-promoted FK Avala in their debut season 2016–17 in Belgrade Zone League. He got relegated due to poor quality in squad, and uninterested club management. He resigned at the end of the season. In the 2017–18 season he took the helm of FK Sremčica and a club from Belgrade Zone League. He completely rebuilt the squad prior to the season resulting poor displays in the first seven rounds. After that, everything got better and FK Sremčica won 4 matches plus 4 matches ended in a draw, which led to 10th place after the first part of the season.

References

External links
 

1975 births
Living people
People from Trebinje
Serbs of Bosnia and Herzegovina
Association football midfielders
Bosnia and Herzegovina footballers
Serbian footballers
OFK Bečej 1918 players
FK Rad players
FK Leotar players
Fortuna Düsseldorf players
FK Mogren players
OFK Grbalj players
FK Sinđelić Beograd players
Bosnia and Herzegovina expatriate footballers
Expatriate footballers in Germany
Bosnia and Herzegovina expatriate sportspeople in Germany
Bosnia and Herzegovina football managers
Serbian football managers